Kurichiya is an unclassified Southern Dravidian language spoken by the Kurichiya, a Scheduled tribe of India. The two dialects, Kunnam and Wayanad, are no closer to each other than they are to Malayalam. The Kurichiya language has 27 identified phonemes, of which 5 are vowels and 22 are consonants. Frequent consonants include /p, t, c, k/ and /m, n/, while /b, v/ occur less frequently.

References

Sources

Dravidian languages